Bite is a 2015 body horror film written and directed by Chad Archibald and starring Elma Begovic, Annette Wozniak, Denise Yuen, Jordan Gray, Lawrene Denkers, Barry Birnberg, Daniel Klimitz, Tianna Nori, and Caroline Palmer. It was produced by Black Fawn Films and Breakthrough Entertainment. The plot is about a young woman who is bitten by a waterborne insect while in Costa Rica and suffers horrifying and transformative consequences.

Plot
Casey (Elma Begovic) celebrates her bachelorette party with her friends Kirsten and Jill in Costa Rica. Casey gets bitten by an insect at one point during the trip, but is too preoccupied to take note, thinking of it as an ordinary bite. She is second-guessing her impending wedding to her fiancé Jared Kennedy, and exasperated with Jared's mother, who happens to be Casey’s landlord. After returning home, her body mutates gradually, her senses get worse, she is no longer able to feed herself, and she is plagued by nightmares. When she wakes up one day, there are insect eggs in her apartment. Jared's mother invades Casey's apartment to angrily challenge her about her plans to marry her son, but Casey kills her by spitting acid. Her friend Kirsten is very worried and visits Casey, but Casey also kills her when Kirsten finds the body of Mrs. Kennedy and panics.

Casey's friend Jill is actually in love with Jared, and she stole Casey's engagement ring in Costa Rica, letting Casey believe that she had a one-night stand. In fact, Casey was forced into sex while drunk against her will, and Jill recorded the act. Jill shows Jared the pictures of Casey kissing the other man and seduces Jared into sex in her car. Casey overhears the two of them due to her mutating sense of hearing.  Jill enters Casey's apartment and is overpowered by Casey and tied to a chair. When she wakes up, a heavily transformed Casey forces her to watch the videos of her rape. She also forces Jill to call for Jared, who then enters the apartment. Casey kills Jill, causing a fight between Jared and her. Although Jared is able to kill Casey, he is seriously injured by a sting. He drags himself back to his apartment and tries to make an emergency call from his mobile, but fails.

A week later, the entire house is quarantined. The police raid the house and find the bodies of Mrs. Kennedy, Jill and Kirsten in Casey's apartment. In Jared's apartment, they find the seriously-injured and already-mutated Jared in a kind of cocoon. When they try to help him, many eggs and insects swell from his body and attack the police. At the end of the film, two joggers are talking about an upcoming trip to Costa Rica. One of them is bitten by an insect, but she dismisses it as "just a bite".

Cast
 Elma Begovic as Casey
 Annette Wozniak as Jill
 Denise Yuen as Kirsten
 Jordan Gray as Jared
 Lawrene Denkers as Mrs. Kennedy
 Barry Birnberg as Mr. Mathenson
 Daniel Klimitz as Mao
 Tianna Nori as Joanne
 Caroline Palmer as Hannah

Release
Bite was released in 2015 at the Fantasia International Film Festival, Fantasy Filmfest, Film4 Fright Fest, Mile High Horror Film Festival, Sitges Film Festival, Lund International Fantastic Film Festival, Chicago International Film Festival, Tucson Terrorfest, Night Visions Film Festival, Another Hole in the Head Film Festival, Monster Fest. Blood in the Snow Canadian Film Festival, and Texas Frightmare Weekend. A subtitled version was released in Madrid, Spain on June 7, 2016.

Reception
The film received mixed to negative reviews from critics. Review aggregator website Rotten Tomatoes reports an approval rating of 50% based on 18 reviews, with an average rating of 5.81/10. Metacritic reports an aggregated score of 57 based on 4 critics, indicating "mixed or average reviews".

The beginning of the film and character development in particular were criticized, with the relationships and acting being described as unconvincing and generic to the point of being parodic, while the complex themes and body-horror elements were generally viewed more favorably by critics, Brian Tallerico from RogerEbert.com called it "one of those early career horror entries in which the filmmakers don't quite nail the set-up or the landing, but the gooey center of the film works for those with a high tolerance for things that might make a majority of the population queasy."

Phil Wheat from Nerdly had a slightly more positive takeaway after seeing the Frightfest 2015 screening: "Bite is strange and claustrophobic tale of sexuality, horror and bodily fluids recalls the best of David Cronenberg (Rabid, Shivers, The Fly), even echoing of Roman Polanski's Repulsion in the isolated madness of Casey's condition. And as such is unmissable" and Matt Boiselle from Dread Central stated that "Bite definitely has the chops to be the Fly of the new age and simply shouldn't be missed, especially if you're a gorehound on the prowl."

Many audience members were apparently unprepared for the gruesome content of the film however, as Fantasia Film Festival co-director Mitch Davis said on Facebook, "I leave the BITE premiere for all of ten minutes and the following text lights up my phone: "2 people fainted. One girl is puking and another hit his head on stairs". Truth." Davis also had special Bite branded barf-bags handed out to the audience.

References

External links
 
 

2015 films
2015 horror films
Canadian body horror films
Canadian independent films
Canadian splatter films
English-language Canadian films
Films set in apartment buildings
2010s English-language films
2010s Canadian films